The scientific name Cyclamen vernum has been applied to several species:

Cyclamen balearicum
Cyclamen repandum
Cyclamen coum
Cyclamen parviflorum